Kaviya Thalaivan or Kaaviya Thalaivan may refer to:

 Kaviya Thalaivan (1992 film), starring Vijayakanth and Bhanupriya
 Kaaviya Thalaivan (2014 film), starring Prithviraj Sukumaran and Siddharth
 Kaaviya Thalaivan (soundtrack), soundtrack of 2014 film